Visor, svarta och röda (English: Songs, black and red) is a studio album by the Swedish-Dutch folk singer-songwriter Cornelis Vreeswijk. For this recording, Vreeswijk sings songs with lyrics by Swedish writer Lars Forsell.

Track listing
Lyrics by Lars Forssell.  Music as noted.
"Staffan var en stalledräng" (Kjell Andersson) - 3:00
"Helena (She's An Easy Rider)" (Tucker Zimmerman) - 3:21
"Desertören (Le déserteur)" (Boris Vian) - 2:40
"Till herr Andersson" (Cornelis Vreeswijk) - 3:18
"Djävulens sång (Le Gorille)" (Georges Brassens) - 2:21
"Ulla Winblad" (Pierre Ström) - 1:36
"Menuett på Haga (La Polka du roi)" (Charles Trenet) - 3:03
"Jack uppskäraren" (Kjell Andersson) - 3:29
"Jenny Jansson (Jenny Jenkins)" (trad.; arr.: Kjell Andersson) - 2:22
"The Establishment" (Cornelis Vreeswijk)- 2:23
"Avanti Popolo" (trad.arr.: Kjell Andersson) - 1:57
"Vaggvisa för Bim, Cornelis och alla andra människor på jorden" (Kjell Andersson) - 2:44

References

Cornelis Vreeswijk albums
1972 albums